The Afro-Asian Women's Conference, was an international women's conference, which took place in Colombo in Ceylon in 15-24 February 1958. 

It is known as the first Afro-Asian Women's Conference. As a Afro-Asian international conference, it was preceded by the first Afro-Asian Peoples' Solidarity Conference in Cairo, Egypt, (December 26, 1957 to January 1, 1958). 

It was arranged by women's groups from Ceylon, Burma, Indonesia and Pakistan. Representatives from a number of countries in Asia and Africa attended. Among them were delegates from Afghanistan, which was the first time women represented Afghanistan in public. 

It was followed by the Afro-Asian Women's Conference in Cairo, Egypt, January 1961.

See also
 All-Asian Women's Conference
 Second Eastern Women's Congress

References 

1958 conferences
1958 in Ceylon
Events in Colombo
Women's conferences
1958 in women's history
History of women in Sri Lanka